Al Zaidan or Zaidan is an agricultural village just west of Baghdad, Iraq.  

During the US occupation Iraq, it was considered a hub of insurgent activity (especially by the 1920 Revolution Brigade)  It is populated mainly by the Zobai tribe. The area also sends representatives to the Abu Ghraib district in Baghdad.

Gallery

References

Populated places in Baghdad Province